Md Shafeenul Islam BGBM(Bar), ndc, psc is a former Major General in Bangladesh Army and former Director General of Border Guards Bangladesh.

Early life
Shafeenul Islam was born on 2 March 1966 in Tilakpur, Joypurhat District. He joined the Bangladesh Military Academy on 25 June 1984. He was commissioned with 14th BMA Long course on 27 June 1986 in the Corps of Infantry of the Bangladesh Army. He is a graduate of Defence Services Command and Staff College and National Defence College, Bangladesh. He obtained two master's degrees in defence studies, one from National University, Bangladesh and another from King Abdul Aziz University, Saudi Arabia.

Career
Shafeen has commanded several units or formations including an infantry battalion, a battle-group and two infantry brigades. As a staff officer, he served as the brigade major of an infantry brigade, and then served as an instructor at the School of Infantry & Tactics and at the Defence Services Command and Staff College, in Mirpur. He has also served in the DGFI as Director CIB, AFD as DG Intelligence.

His operational service includes a deployment in support of the United Nations Assistance Mission for Iraq as an observer.

He was appointed to the Bangladesh Tea Board on 14 February 2016 as its chairman. During his tenure as chairman, he promoted the diversification of tea products including introducing pickles made from tea to the Bangladesh Tea Expo. He was appointed as the Director General of Border Guards Bangladesh (BGB) in March 2018 replacing Major General Abul Hossain.On 18 February 2022, Major General Shakil Ahmed became the director general of BGB by replacing him and General Shafeen brought back to Armed Forces from deputation.

Achievements 
As the DG BGB, Shafeen reduced border violence. Within a short period as DG, he visited almost all the remote bordering areas and border outposts, where he talked with deployed BGB members and inquired about their well-being. Shafeen has also assisted the government to handle Rohingya issues along the border.

Shafeenul Islam was praised by the Prime Minister of Bangladesh, Sheikh Hasina, for his efforts to diversify tea products including using tea to make pickles and cosmetic products.

Family life 
Shafeenul is married to Shoma Islam. The couple have only a daughter. Shafeen's father, Colonel Md Nurul Islam, an Army Medical Corps officer also served in the Bangladesh Army for 33 years before retiring in 1994. His only brother, Air Commodore Sitwat Nayeem, is a fighter pilot in the Bangladesh Air Force and his sister, Shahneela Islam, is self employed.

References

Living people
1966 births
Bangladesh Army generals
Director Generals of Border Guards Bangladesh